Legnava is a village and municipality in the Stará Ľubovňa District, Prešov Region in northern Slovakia. It has 146 inhabitants.

History

Early History
The village was founded after 1366, when the then Hungarian king Louis I gave a nobleman Jakub a forested area near the villages of Starina, Orlov, near the Poprad river, to create a village.

Legnava under Hungarian Rule
In the past, the village had tax ports that belonged to the Brežnovica family. In the documents from the 15th and 16th centuries, the tax ports are mentioned sporadically under the name, "Langno", the Hungarian variant of the name, other name included, Lagnó and Hosszúvágás. As well as German names such as Legenau and Langhaw. Documents from 1440 show that the village was named, "Valasi".

In 1600, the village consisted of 16 serf houses. At the end of the 16th century, Legnava was a medium-sized municipality with exclusively serf population mostly of Rusyn origin. In the 17th century, most land around the village belonged to the Semsey family. The land was later given to the Szirmay family in the 18th century. A chapel built by Tomáš Szirmay (1760) is located 1 km from the village.

By the end of the 19th century, the village had 503 inhabitants, the highest number recorded in the village's history. At that time, the inhabitants made their living mainly by hard labour, such as farming and construction.

Present

References

https://web.archive.org/web/20131019093154/http://legnava.eu/

External links
 
 

Villages and municipalities in Stará Ľubovňa District
Šariš